Lendži Parish is an administrative unit of Rēzekne Municipality, Latvia.

Towns, villages and settlements of Lendži parish

References 

Parishes of Latvia
Rēzekne Municipality